Honghu Town is an urban town in Changshou District, Chongqing, People's Republic of China.

Administrative division
The town is divided into 14 villages, the following areas: Fenghuang Village, Biao'er Village, Yongshun Village, Puxing Village, Pingtan Village, Chengtuo Village, Tizi Village, Caoyan Village, Matou Village, Luchi Village, Heiyan Village, Sanhe Village, Wulong Village, and Changsheng Village (凤凰村、表耳村、永顺村、普兴村、坪滩村、称沱村、梯子村、草堰村、码头村、芦池村、黑岩村、三合村、五龙村、长生村).

External links

Divisions of Changshou District
Towns in Chongqing